Diospyros havilandii is a tree in the family Ebenaceae. Twigs are reddish brown when young, drying whitish. Inflorescences bear up to five flowers. The tree is named for the British naturalist G. D. Haviland. Its habitat is peat swamp forests. D. havilandii is endemic to Borneo and confined to Sarawak.

References

havilandii
Endemic flora of Borneo
Trees of Borneo
Flora of Sarawak
Plants described in 1933